The Frankfurt Christmas Market and Craft Market is an annual outdoor Christmas market and craft fair held in central Birmingham, England. The market started in 2001 with 24 stalls and has expanded every year. It opens in mid November and continues until late December, closing just before Christmas.

The Christmas Market and Craft Fair is located in Centenary Square, Chamberlain Square, New Street, and Victoria Square. It is the largest such market outside Germany and Austria, attracting over 3.1 million visitors in 2010, over 5 million visitors in 2011, almost 5 million visitors in 2013 and over 5.5 million visitors in 2014. German food and drink such as Bratwurst and Glühwein are available.

On 15 November 2018, after an inspection by Birmingham City Council's environmental health officials, twenty of the market's food stalls were ordered to improve hygiene . Two further stalls were summarily closed for failing to display mandatory allergen advice. When reinspected on 20 November, all the stalls were found to meet the required standards.

From 2018 the market has been kicked off with a performance of Hosen Brass down Birmingham's New Street on behalf of Free Radio Birmingham before the lights are officially turned on.

The market is affiliated with the Frankfurt Christmas Market in the city of Frankfurt, one of the oldest such markets in Germany (dating from 1393), hence the name. Birmingham is twinned with Frankfurt.

On 9 September 2020, the organisers of the Christmas market cancelled the 2020 event because of the COVID-19 pandemic.

See also
 List of Christmas markets

References

External

 Frankfurt Christmas Market and Craft Market, Birmingham City Council
 

2001 establishments in England
Recurring events established in 2001
Christmas markets in the United Kingdom
Culture in Birmingham, West Midlands
Annual events in England
Events in Birmingham, West Midlands
Economy of Birmingham, West Midlands
Food markets in the United Kingdom
Retail markets in England
Crafts